Edward Tabb House, also known as "Rural Hill," is a historic home located near Hedgesville, Berkeley County, West Virginia. It was built about 1810 and is a large Federal style rubble limestone dwelling consisting of a central block with wing. The rear section was added about 1820. The house measures 37 feet deep and 62 feet across. The entrance features a porch with paired Doric order columns and a Chippendale-style transom.

It was listed on the National Register of Historic Places in 1984.

References

Houses on the National Register of Historic Places in West Virginia
Federal architecture in West Virginia
Houses completed in 1810
Houses in Berkeley County, West Virginia
National Register of Historic Places in Berkeley County, West Virginia